Michael James Williamson (born 8 November 1983) is an English professional football manager and player who plays as a centre back. He is the player-manager of  club Gateshead.

Club career

Early career
Born in Stoke-on-Trent, Staffordshire, Williamson played six first-team games for Torquay United before joining Southampton in November 2001 for an initial fee believed to be in the region of £100,000. However, Williamson was unable to get into the first team at Southampton. He returned to Plainmoor on loan for two months in September 2003, where he made 11 further appearances. A further loan spell at Doncaster Rovers—then Third Division leaders—followed on transfer deadline day in March 2004, although he did not feature for the South Yorkshire club.

Wycombe Wanderers
Wycombe Wanderers manager Tony Adams secured Williamson's services on a season-long loan in July 2004, a move that was made permanent at the end of the 2004–05 season. Williamson made the number 6 shirt his own from the start of the 2005–06 season. In total, he made 144 league appearances for Wycombe, scoring 11 league goals during his time at the club.

Watford
After a few consistent seasons he signed for Watford on 26 January 2009 for an undisclosed fee, signing a three-and-a-half-year contract. He handed in a transfer request on 27 August 2009, declaring himself unfit for the away game at Swansea City on the Saturday and not travelling with the squad.

Portsmouth
On 1 September 2009, Watford accepted a £2 million offer, potentially rising to £3 million, from Premier League team Portsmouth. He did not make a single appearance for the club, who were in the midst of a financial crisis.

Newcastle United

Williamson signed for Newcastle United on 27 January 2010 for an undisclosed fee. He made his debut the same day at St James' Park in a 2–0 win over Crystal Palace, in which he played the full 90 minutes and won the Man of the Match award in the process. On 28 January it was revealed that he was initially signed on an emergency loan deal in order for him to play the previous day, with the deal then finalised and Williamson signing a three-and-a-half-year contract.
On 3 December 2010, Williamson signed a new five-and-a-half-year contract extension with the club, which ran until 2016. For the remainder of the season, he formed a reliable partnership with Fabricio Coloccini in the absence of the injured Steven Taylor.

With Newcastle's return to the Premier League, Williamson continued to be Coloccini's first-choice partner and managed to keep Taylor on the bench until an injury ended his run in the starting eleven. He made his comeback against Sunderland in the second matchday of the 2011–12 season but was ruled out again with consecutive arm and ankle injuries.

On 30 August 2014, Williamson scored his first goal for the club in a 3–3 home league draw against Crystal Palace, tapping the ball in after teammate Rolando Aarons struck the post.

On 3 May 2015, Williamson was sent off picking up a second yellow after a late challenge on Jamie Vardy, as Newcastle lost 3–0 to Leicester City, their eighth defeat in a row. After the match, Newcastle manager John Carver accused Williamson of deliberately getting himself sent off, which Williamson strongly denied.

Wolverhampton Wanderers
Having not featured in the league under new coach Steve McClaren, Williamson was loaned to Championship side Wolverhampton Wanderers on 29 October 2015 for one month to cover for the injured Kortney Hause. His debut came two days later in Wolves' next game, a 2–0 win away to rivals Birmingham City in which Williamson received the man of the match award. After making three appearances, over the course of which the club conceded just one goal and picked up four points, his loan was initially extended until January, but he was recalled after five appearances in total because of injuries at his parent club. However, Williamson immediately picked up an injury of his own which subsequently kept him out for the rest of 2015–16 season.

Despite his injury, on 29 January 2016, Williamson put pen to paper on an 18-month contract with Wolves after impressing during his earlier loan spell at the Midlands club, for a reported fee of £250,000. Williamson said upon signing for Wolves: "I loved my time here so that's why I'm here now. It's great to be back." However, persistent injury problems prevented him from making a single appearance that year and he was not assigned a squad number at the start of the 2016–17 season. He eventually made a return to football on 7 January 2017, making his first senior appearance for Wolves since signing permanently, in a 2–0 FA Cup away win against Stoke. Two months later he made his first league appearance, in a 2–1 defeat to Reading in which he was sent off for two yellow-card offences. His final appearance for the club came in a 3–1 defeat to Derby County at Pride Park on 29 April 2017.

After having made just six appearances across all competitions since signing permanently for the club, in spite of his expressed desire to stay, it was announced on 19 May 2017 that Williamson would be released by Wolves upon the expiry of his contract.

Oxford United
Williamson signed for Oxford United of League One on 26 July 2017 on a one-year contract. He made his debut against Oldham Athletic in the opening match of the 2017–18 season, which ended in a 2–0 away victory for Oxford. He made 14 league appearances during the season, at the end of which he was released by newly appointed manager Karl Robinson.

Gateshead
In August 2018, he signed a one-year contract with Gateshead. Williamson, like the majority of Gateshead's players and staff, did not have his contract renewed at the end of the season due to financial issues. He became a player-coach on 14 January 2019 after Ben Clark was appointed manager permanently.

Williamson was appointed as player-manager of Gateshead on 11 June 2019 with Ian Watson as his assistant, after the club's demotion to the National League North. His side were in eighth, two points off the playoffs, when the season was abandoned in March 2020 due to the COVID-19 pandemic.

After picking up a maximum 12 points from four games in December 2021, seeing his side in the promotion picture, Williamson was awarded the National League North Manager of the Month. On 2 May 2022, in the penultimate match of the 2021–22 season, a 2–2 draw with Chorley saw Gateshead crowned champions and promoted back to the National League, three years after their demotion. Williamson was later named National League North Manager of the Season.

Career statistics

Managerial statistics

Honours

As a player
Torquay United
Football League Third Division third-place promotion: 2003–04

Wycombe Wanderers
Football League Two third-place promotion: 2008–09

Newcastle United
Football League Championship: 2009–10

As a manager
Gateshead
National League North: 2021–22

Individual
National League North Manager of the Month: December 2021
National League North Manager of the Year: 2021–22

References

External links

1983 births
Living people
Footballers from Stoke-on-Trent
English footballers
Association football defenders
Torquay United F.C. players
Southampton F.C. players
Doncaster Rovers F.C. players
Wycombe Wanderers F.C. players
Watford F.C. players
Portsmouth F.C. players
Newcastle United F.C. players
Wolverhampton Wanderers F.C. players
Oxford United F.C. players
Gateshead F.C. players
English Football League players
Premier League players
National League (English football) players
English football managers
Gateshead F.C. managers
Gateshead F.C. non-playing staff